Riverwood (formerly Riverside) is an unincorporated community in Multnomah County, Oregon. It lies at an elevation of about 436 feet (133 m).

See also
Riverside, Oregon (disambiguation)

References

Portland metropolitan area
Unincorporated communities in Multnomah County, Oregon
Unincorporated communities in Oregon
Populated places on the Willamette River